The Saccharomycodaceae are a family of yeasts in the order Saccharomycetales. According to the 2007 Outline of Ascomycota, the family contains four genera, although the placement of three of these (Hanseniaspora, Nadsonia, and Wickerhamia) is uncertain. Species in the family have a cosmopolitan distribution and are found in both temperate and tropical areas.

References

 

Saccharomycetes
Ascomycota families